Thierry Pham (born 28 April 1962) is a former professional tennis player from France.

Career
Pham played in a Davis Cup tie for France in 1986, against Turkey, with they won 5–0. He won both of his singles rubbers, over Alaaddin Karagoz and Necvet Demir.

In the 1986 French Open, Pham had wins over Dutchman Menno Oosting and world number 54 Jaime Yzaga, to make the third round, where he was defeated by Francisco Maciel in four sets. He also made the second round of the men's doubles (with Bruno Dadillon) and the round of 16 in the mixed doubles (with Catherine Suire). His only other appearance in the main singles draw of a Grand Slam came at the 1987 French Open and he beat Patrik Kühnen in the first round, then lost to 14th seed Martín Jaite.

Challenger titles

Doubles: (1)

References

1962 births
Living people
French male tennis players
French people of Vietnamese descent
Tennis players from Lyon